Gagar (pronounced: gāger), a metal pitcher used to store water in earlier days, is also used as a musical instrument in number of Punjabi folk songs and dances. It is played with both hands with rings worn on fingers. It is closely associated with the other music instrument, Gharha, which is an earthen pitcher. Gagar is traditionally used by milk venders as milk container also in Majha region (Amritsar, Gurdaspur and Tarantaran districts) of Punjab.

Gallery

See also

Rohtas
Punjab

References

Punjabi music
Folk instruments of Punjab